RTHK Radio 3 is a broadcasting station under Radio Television Hong Kong. It was launched on 30 June 1928 and is the first radio broadcast station in Hong Kong. At present, the station broadcasts on 567 kHz for all of Hong Kong, as well as additional FM frequency in selected regions.

RTHK Radio 3, which is mainly broadcast in English, is positioned as a “news and information and entertainment platform” to tie in with the pace of international metropolises in Hong Kong and provide information for English speakers in Hong Kong to help them understand world and local affairs. There are Nepali, Urdu and Tagalog periods. Notable shows include current affairs program 'Backchat', economics and finance-oriented 'Money Talk', and afternoon lifestyle program 'The 1 2 3 Show'. RTHK Radio 3 was officially similar and related to BBC Radio 4.

History 
The station was the first radio station established by Radio Television Hong Kong. From the beginning, the call sign was GOW and the frequencies were AM 845 kHz and AM 1525 kHz. On 1 February 1929, the call sign was changed to ZBW and the frequency was AM 860 kHz. In August 1948, the station cancelled its call sign and changed its name in 1981.

Radio team organized and broadcast fundraising reality shows for charity since 1960s. Later, in 1980s, RTHK Radio 3 invented Christmas contest that was called "Operation Santa Claus", that was also for charity, and this contest became a longstanding Christmas tradition in Hong Kong.

World's Most Durable DJ Uncle Ray 

DJ Uncle Ray (Ray Cordeiro) was called in 2000 by Guinness World Records as The World's Most Durable DJ. Currently, Ray Cordeiro hosts RTHK Radio 3 "All the Way with Uncle Ray", show of popular music. He started his radio career with Radio Rediffusion in 1949 in age of 25, and joined RTHK in 1960.

References

External links 

 

RTHK
Radio stations in Hong Kong